6349 Acapulco, provisional designation , is a dark Adeonian asteroid from the middle region of the asteroid belt, approximately 22 kilometers in diameter.

The asteroid was discovered on 8 February 1995, by Japanese astronomer Masahiro Koishikawa at the Ayashi Station of the Sendai Astronomical Observatory in the Tōhoku region of Japan. It was named for the Mexican city of Acapulco.

Orbit and classification 

Acapulco is a member of the Adeona family, a large family of carbonaceous asteroids. It orbits the Sun in the central main-belt at a distance of 2.3–3.0 AU once every 4 years and 4 months (1,590 days). Its orbit has an eccentricity of 0.14 and an inclination of 11° with respect to the ecliptic.

The body's observation arc begins 42 years prior to its official discovery observation at Ayashi, with a precovery taken at Palomar Observatory in 1953.

Physical characteristics

Lightcurves 

A rotational lightcurve of Acapulco was obtained from photometric observations made at the Palomar Transient Factory in September 2010. Lightcurve analysis gave a rotation period of  hours with a brightness variation of 0.18 magnitude.

Diameter and albedo 

According to the surveys carried out by the Infrared Astronomical Satellite IRAS, the Japanese Akari satellite, and NASA's Wide-field Infrared Survey Explorer with its subsequent NEOWISE mission, Acapulco measures between 14.66 and 23.02 kilometers in diameter, and its surface has an albedo in the range of 0.037 to 0.10.

The Collaborative Asteroid Lightcurve Link assumes an albedo of 0.10 and calculates a smaller diameter of 12.35 kilometers with an absolute magnitude of 12.66.

Naming 

This minor planet was named for the Mexican city of Acapulco, known for its major seaport, which is considered to be among the most beautiful ones in the world.

Since 1973, Acapulco is the sister city of the Japanese city of Sendai, where the discovering observatory is located, and after which the minor planet 3133 Sendai is named. Hasekura Tsunenaga (1571–1622) – retainer of Date Masamune, who founded the city of Sendai – stopped by at Acapulco on his diplomatic mission to Rome. The official naming citation was published by the Minor Planet Center on 2 February 1999 .

References

External links 
 Asteroid Lightcurve Database (LCDB), query form (info )
 Dictionary of Minor Planet Names, Google books
 Asteroids and comets rotation curves, CdR – Observatoire de Genève, Raoul Behrend
 Discovery Circumstances: Numbered Minor Planets (5001)-(10000) – Minor Planet Center
 
 

006349
Discoveries by Masahiro Koishikawa
Named minor planets
19950208